Adolf II of Berg-Hövel (Huvili), count of Berg, count in Auelgau and Siegburg, Vogt of Werden (died 1090/1106), was the son of Adolf I of Berg.

He married Adelaide of Lauffen, a daughter of Heinrich II count von Laufen (died 1067) and Ida von Werl-Hövel (1030? – 1090), and heiress of Hövel/Huvili, Unna, Telgte, Warendorf, etc.

At the beginning of the 12th century Adolf II of Berg donated the site of their old ancestral castle, Schloss Berg, to Cistercian monks from Burgundy. Adolf IV later built the Altenberg Abbey.

He had issue:

 Adolf III of Berg count of Berg and Hövel, Vogt of Werden (born 1080, died 12 Oct 1152).

Literature
 Alberic of Troisfontaines (MGH, Scriptores XXIII). 
 Annales Rodenses (MGH, Scriptores, XVI). 
 Annalista Saxo (MGH, Scriptores VI). 
 Gesta Trevirorum (MGH, Scriptores VIII). 
 MGH, Diplomata. – REK I-II. – Rheinisches UB. 
 Hömberg, “Geschichte.” – Jackman, “Counts of Cologne.” 
 Klebel, E. “Niederösterreich und der Stammbaum der Grafen von Görz und Schwarzburg.” Unsere Heimat. Monatsblatt des Vereins für Landeskunde von Niederösterreich 23 (1952) 111–23. 
 Kluger, “Propter claritatem generis.” 
 Lück, D. “Der Avelgau, die erste fassbare Gebietseinteilung an der unteren Sieg.” In: Heimatbuch der Stadt Siegburg I. Ed. H. J. Roggendorf. Siegburg, 1964. pp. 223–85. 
 Lück, D. “In pago Tuizichgowe – Anmerkungen zum Deutzgau.” Rechtsrheinisches Köln 3 (1977) 1–9. 
 Tyroller, “Genealogie.” 
 Wunder, G. “Die Nichten des Erzbischofs Friedrich von Köln.” AHVN 164 (1962) 192–6. 
 Wunder, G. “Die Verwandtschaft des Erzbischofs Friedrich I. von Köln. Ein Beitrag zur abendländischen Verflechtung des Hochadels im Mittelalter.” AHVN 166 (1964) 25–54.

Counts of Berg
House of Berg
Counts of Limburg
House of Limburg-Stirum
11th-century births
1090 deaths
1106 deaths
Year of death uncertain